Arctides regalis is a species of tropical lobster. Its common name is royal Spanish lobster and it is known as ula-papapa in Hawaii.

Description
The species can be found in the tropical Indo-Pacific in underwater caves. The lobster stays off of muddy and sandy bottoms. Its orange-red coloring allows it to blend in with Tubastraea coral that grows in its hiding place.

The lobster can be kept in an aquarium with free-swimming fish, but it should be the only one of its species in the tank because they do not get along.

References

Crustaceans described in 1963
Achelata